Gustave Coquiot (24 September 1865 – 6 June 1926) was a French art critic and writer. A collector of paintings by Maurice Utrillo, he also was one of Auguste Rodin's secretaries.

Theatre 
 1904: Deux heures du matin, quartier Marbeuf, play, with Jean Lorrain 
 1904: Sainte-Roulette with Jean Lorrain, Théâtre des Bouffes du Nord  
 1905: Hôtel de l'Ouest, chambre 22, play, with Jean Lorrain
 1908: L'Ami de la justice, comedy in 1 act with Trébla

Essais 
1912 :Le vrai J.-K. Huysmans 
1913: Toulouse Lautrec,  publisher
1913: Le Vrai Rodin
1914: Cubistes, Futuristes, Passéistes. Essai sur la Jeune Peinture et la Jeune Sculpture. Avec 48 reproductions. 5e édition. Paris, Ollendorff (n.d. ca. 1920). 277 pp. [First edition was published in 1914 and had 24 plates in phototypie] 
1917: Rodin à l'Hôtel de Biron et à Meudon, Ollendorff, Paris, (Online)
1921: Vagabondages, illustrated by 
1923: Vincent Van Gogh  
1924: Georges Seurat  
1925: Renoir  
1927: Des Gloires déboulonnées'' with 16 reproductions new edition 1927,  publisher.

Portraits 
 By Picasso, 1901, Paris, musée national d'art moderne-centre Pompidou, Bequest by madame Coquiot (1933).
 By Picasso, 1901 (Zervos, Vol. 1, 85), huile sur carton, 46 x 37 cm, Zurich, Fondation et Collection Emil G. Bührle.

External links 
 
 

20th-century French dramatists and playwrights
French art critics
People from Côte-d'Or
1865 births
1926 deaths